Allomogurnda is a genus of fishes in the family Eleotridae native to freshwater habitats of New Guinea and surrounding smaller islands.

Species
The recognized species in this genus are:
 Allomogurnda flavimarginata G. R. Allen, 2003
 Allomogurnda hoesei G. R. Allen, 2003
 Allomogurnda insularis G. R. Allen, 2003
 Allomogurnda landfordi G. R. Allen, 2003
 Allomogurnda montana G. R. Allen, 2003
 Allomogurnda nesolepis (M. C. W. Weber, 1907) (yellowbelly gudgeon)
 Allomogurnda papua G. R. Allen, 2003
 Allomogurnda sampricei G. R. Allen, 2003

References

Eleotridae